Yanina Karolchyk-Pravalinskaya (née Karolchyk, born 26 December 1976) is a Belarusian shot putter who won an Olympic gold medal at the 2000 Summer Olympics in Sydney, Australia, and a gold medal at the 2001 World Championships in Edmonton, Alberta.

In June 2003, at a meet in Germany, Korolchik tested positive for the steroid clenbuterol. She was banned for two years and missed the 2004 Summer Olympics.

She threw her longest distance in nine years in her 2010 season opener at the Olympic Champions Trophy meeting in Minsk, recording a best mark of 19.95 m.

Karolchyk is married to Belarusian singer Uladzimer Pravalinski.

Achievements

References

External links

1976 births
Living people
Belarusian female shot putters
Athletes (track and field) at the 2000 Summer Olympics
Athletes (track and field) at the 2008 Summer Olympics
Athletes (track and field) at the 2012 Summer Olympics
Olympic athletes of Belarus
Olympic gold medalists for Belarus
Doping cases in athletics
Belarusian sportspeople in doping cases
World Athletics Championships medalists
European Athletics Championships medalists
Medalists at the 2000 Summer Olympics
Olympic gold medalists in athletics (track and field)
World Athletics Championships winners